Tumidagena is a genus of delphacid planthoppers in the family Delphacidae. There are at least three described species in Tumidagena.

Species
These three species belong to the genus Tumidagena:
 Tumidagena minuta McDermott, 1952
 Tumidagena propinqua McDermott, 1952
 Tumidagena terminalis (Metcalf, 1923)

References

Further reading

External links

 

Delphacini
Auchenorrhyncha genera